Noah Gregory Centineo (born May 9, 1996) is an American actor. He began his career performing on television and had a main role in the television series The Fosters from 2015 to 2018. He achieved wider recognition by starring in the Netflix romantic comedy films To All the Boys I've Loved Before (2018), Sierra Burgess Is a Loser (2018), and The Perfect Date (2019).

In 2022, Centineo played Atom Smasher in the superhero film Black Adam and starred in the Netflix spy-adventure series The Recruit.

Early life
Noah Gregory Centineo was born and raised in Boca Raton, Florida. He is of half Italian and half Dutch descent. He has an older sister. He attended BAK Middle School of the Arts and then Boca Raton Community High School for ninth and tenth grade, and played soccer there. In 2012, he moved to Los Angeles and attended Agoura High School.

Career
In 2009, Centineo starred as the lead in the family film The Gold Retrievers. He had small roles in the Disney Channel sitcoms Austin & Ally and Shake It Up. He co-starred as Jaden Stark in the Disney Channel Original Movie How to Build a Better Boy (2014). In the same year, he was cast as Ben Eastman in the Disney Channel comedy pilot Growing Up and Down, which was not picked up to series.

In 2015, Centineo was cast in the main role of Jesus Adams Foster in Freeform's drama series The Fosters where the character was previously portrayed by Jake T. Austin in season 1-2. He made his first appearance in season three's episode "Lucky", which aired on August 17, 2015. In 2017, he was nominated for the Teen Choice Award for Choice Summer TV Star: Male for his performance. In 2017, Centineo starred as Hawk Carter in go90's teen drama-thriller series Tagged which ended in 2018. He portrayed surfer/artist Johnny Sanders Jr. in the coming-of-age romantic comedy SPF-18. Also that year he appeared as Camila Cabello's love interest in the music video for her single "Havana."

Centineo starred in the teen comedy Netflix original To All the Boys film series. In the first film he was Peter Kavinsky in the adaptation of Jenny Han's romance novel To All the Boys I've Loved Before. He received positive reviews and became a teen idol. He also starred as Jamey in Sierra Burgess Is a Loser and as Lance in Swiped. In 2019, he played the lead role of Brooks Rattigan in another Netflix romantic comedy film, The Perfect Date, which was released in April. He had a supporting part in the reboot of Charlie's Angels, which was released in November 2019.

In 2020, he returned as Peter Kavinsky in the sequel To All the Boys: P.S. I Still Love You.

He also returned as Peter Kavinsky in To All the Boys: Always and Forever on Netflix on February 12, 2021. He was set to play He-Man in Masters of the Universe, a film based on the franchise of the same name to be released by Sony Pictures, but in April 2021 he dropped out of the film. Centineo appeared in the DCEU movie Black Adam playing Albert Rothstein / Atom Smasher. It was announced that he is negotiating for a role in a GameStop short squeeze movie. 
Centineo starred in and executive produced the Netflix spy-adventure series The Recruit, released in December 2022.

Charity work

In 2019, Centineo co-founded Favored Nations with his friend Josh Heller, a Los-Angeles-based actor and lifestyle photographer. Centineo was inspired to found the nonprofit after teaming with Omaze for a contest that raised $280,000 for charity; the prize was a chance to go on a hike and have dinner with him. Centineo serves as CEO and Heller is the chief marketing officer. The 501(c)(3) nonprofit produces and sells a variety of merchandise in collaboration with celebrities and influencers. They are an intermediary between donors and charities; each donor can contribute to a charity from a list of nonprofit organizations that includes Black Lives Matter, Policing Equity, Know Your Rights Camp, Color of Change, The Bail Project, and the Florida Rights Restoration Coalition. The organization has attracted many celebrities and influencers to participate in philanthropic activity. In 2020, Centineo also got Favored Nations involved in a campaign to get out the vote for the 2020 US presidential election. He and Heller opened a voting-themed art house and virtual tour to increase voter participation.

Personal life
In February 2020, Centineo revealed in an interview with Harper's Bazaar that from age 17 to 21, he had experienced "a really dark time in [his] life", during which he used alcohol and drugs. After his 21st birthday, he became sober for a year.

Centineo was in a relationship with model Alexis Ren from March 2019 to April 2020.

Filmography

Film

Television

Music videos

Awards and nominations

References

External links
 
 
 

1996 births
Living people
Male actors from Miami
American people of Italian descent
American male child actors
American male film actors
American male television actors
People from Boynton Beach, Florida
21st-century American male actors
American people of Dutch descent
American people of Puerto Rican descent
Shorty Award winners
Boca Raton Community High School alumni